The 2002–03 Major Indoor Soccer League season was the second season for the league.  The regular season started on September 28, 2002, and ended on March 23, 2003.

League standings

Eastern Conference

Western Conference

Playoffs

Scoring leaders
GP = Games Played, G = Goals, A = Assists, Pts = Points

Sources:

League awards
 Most Valuable Player: Dino Delevski, Kansas City
 Defender of the Year: Genoni Martinez, Harrisburg
 Rookie of the Year: P.J. Wakefield, Baltimore
 Goalkeeper of the Year: Victor Nogueira, Milwaukee
 Coach of the Year: Keith Tozer, Milwaukee
 Championship Series MVP: Denison Cabral, Baltimore

Source:

All-MISL Teams

Sources:

All-Rookie Team

Source:

References

External Links
Major Indoor Soccer League II (RSSSF)

Major Indoor Soccer League (2001–2008)
2002 in American soccer leagues
2003 in American soccer leagues
2002–03